The Amlwch Lighthouse (Grid reference: SH 452937) is a lighthouse tower situated on the outer pier of Amlwch, at the northeast tip of Anglesey, Wales. The existing lighthouse, a square tower erected in 1853, is the fourth on this site.

History 
Two short piers at Amlwch were built following a private Act of Parliament of 1743, when the harbour was improved. Two octagonal houses, with small lanterns protruding from the roof, were added. They were described in the New Seaman's Guide as "small white houses displaying lights at night".

The drydock and lighthouse on the small creek at Amlwch once served the shipping of one of the largest copper mines in Europe, located at Parys Mountain. The significance of the early copper-exporting port at Amlwch makes the lighthouse part of a heritage site of international importance.

See also 

 List of lighthouses in Wales

References

Further reading
Hague, D. B., Lighthouses of Wales: Their Architecture and Archaeology (Royal Commission on the Ancient and Historical Monuments of Wales, edited by Hughes, S., 1994)

External links 
 
 Trinity House

1810s establishments in Wales
1817 establishments in the United Kingdom
Amlwch
Lighthouses in Anglesey
Grade II listed buildings in Anglesey
Grade II listed lighthouses
Lighthouses completed in 1743
Lighthouses completed in 1817
Lighthouses completed in 1853